The Australian men's national ice hockey team (nicknamed the Mighty Roos) represent Australia in the sport of ice hockey under the jurdicstation of Ice Hockey Australia which is a part of the International Ice Hockey Federation (IIHF). Australia competed in the Winter Olympics once, in 1960, when the team lost all of their matches. They have also competed in the Ice Hockey World Championships, 33 times with their best result being a ninth-place finish at the same Olympics with a 13th place (or 5th in Pool B) in 1962. The national team currently are in division two after being relegated from division one in 2013 with the team being currently ranked 35th in the IIHF World Rankings.

History
Some Australian national team players are expatriates of Canada and other hockey-playing nations, who have since become outright citizens of Australia or who hold dual citizenship. Australia's ice hockey team has participated in just one Winter Olympics: the 1960 Games in Squaw Valley, California. Australia lost both their games against powerhouses Czechoslovakia (18–1) and eventual gold medalists, the United States (12–1). The team had previously tried to attend the 1956 games in Cortina d'Ampezzo, Italy, but never received approval from the Australian Olympic Committee.

Australia has competed in the Division II World Championships since 2001. In 2007, they were coached by Steve McKenna, a former eight-year veteran of the National Hockey League. At the 2007 Division II World Championships, Australia won three games and lost one, finishing second in their group behind host nation South Korea and narrowly missing promotion to Division I.

Australia hosted the 2008 IIHF World Championship Division II Group B, which was held in Newcastle. The Mighty Roos finished first and captured the gold medal by winning all five games and were promoted to Division I for the first time ever.

World records
Australia previously held the distinction of holding a world record for most goals and highest winning margin in a IIHF World Championship game; they defeated New Zealand by a score of 58–0 in 1987, breaking the record held by Canada (47 goals against Denmark) since 1949. However this was surpassed in 2008 by the Slovakian women's team (82 goals against Bulgaria).

Tournament record

Olympic Games

World Championships
 1962 – 13th place (5th in Pool B)
 1974 – 21st place (7th in Pool C)
 1979 – 26th place (8th in Pool C)
 1986 – 26th place (10th in Pool C)
 1987 – 25th place (1st in Pool D)
 1989 – 24th place (8th in Pool C)
 1990 – 27th place (2nd in Pool D)
 1992 – 23rd place (3rd in Pool C)
 1993 – 27th place (7th in Pool C)
 1994 – 33rd place (13th in Pool C)
 1995 – 36th place (16th in Pool C)
 1996 – 36th place (8th in Pool D)
 1997 – 34th place (6th in Pool D)
 1998 – 34th place (2nd in Pool D)
 1999 – 34th place (3rd in Pool D)
 2000 – 36th place (3rd in Pool D)
 2001 – 33rd place (3rd in Division II, Group A)
 2002 – 36th place (4th in Division II, Group A)
 2003 – 36th place (4th in Division II, Group A)
 2004 – 33rd place (3rd in Division II, Group A)
 2005 – 31st place (2nd in Division II, Group A)
 2006 – 32nd place (3rd in Division II, Group B)
 2007 – 32nd place (2nd in Division II, Group B)
 2008 – 30th place (1st in Division II, Group B)
 2009 – 27th place (6th in Division I, Group A)
 2010 – 32nd place (2nd in Division II, Group A)
 2011 – 30th place (1st in Division II, Group A)
 2012 – 28th place (6th in Division IB)
 2013 – 32nd place (4th in Division IIA)
 2014 – 32nd place (4th in Division IIA)
 2015 – 34th place (6th in Division IIA)
 2016 – 35th place (1st in Division IIB)
 2017 – 30th place (2nd in Division IIA)
 2018 – 30th place (2nd in Division IIA)
 2019 – 31st place (3rd in Division IIA)
 2020 – Cancelled due to the COVID-19 pandemic
 2021 – Cancelled due to the COVID-19 pandemic
 2022 – Withdrawn

Team

All-time record against other nations
As of 26 April 2018

All-time record against other clubs
As of 11 April 2013

References

External links
Official website
IIHF profile

 
Ice hockey teams in Australia
National ice hockey teams in Oceania